Laura J. Pyrak-Nolte is an American geophysicist who is Distinguished Professor of Physics and Astronomy at Purdue University. She is the former President of the International Society of Porous Media and former President of the  American Rock Mechanics Association. In 2020 Pyrak-Nolte was awarded the Society of Exploration Geophysicists Reginald Fessenden Award. She is a Fellow of the American Geophysical Union.

Early life and education 
After completing a BS in Engineering Science at SUNY Buffalo, Pyrak-Nolte was a graduate student at Virginia Polytechnic, where she studied rift basin geometry using refraction of isotherms with John K. Costain. Pyrak-Nolte completed her doctoral research at the University of California, Berkeley. There she worked on rock mechanics with Neville G. W. Cook. She was awarded various scholarships at Berkeley, including the Jane Lewis Fellowship and Thomas Dias Fellowship.

Research and career 
Pyrak-Nolte was appointed in 1992 as an assistant professor at the University of Notre Dame Department of Civil Engineering and Geological Sciences. She joined Purdue University in 1997, as an associate professor, was promoted to full professor in 2001, and was appointed as a Distinguished Professor of Physics and Astronomy in 2018.

Inspired by her early work in rock mechanics, Pyrak-Nolte continued to study mechanical discontinuities in rocks. The mechanical and hydraulic behaviour of rocks is determined by these discontinuities, and the formation of fractures within such rocks dictates the transport of water and gas through them. Her research considers the mechanisms that underpin seismic processes in complex fractures. She looks to understand the evolution of fractures, how seismic waves interact with fractures and how the geometry of fractures impacts the flow of fluids. She developed a function that describes the relationship between fluid flow and elastic stiffness. By combining fracture surface properties with the outputs of this function, Pyrak-Nolte can infer the fluid flow properties in fractured rock using only seismic data.

To better understand these fractures, Pyrak-Nolte makes use of 3D printing to create synthetic rock samples from a powder of bassanite. During the printing process the bassanite undergoes a chemical reaction with a water-based binder, forming a gypsum sample with precisely controlled internal structures. Pyrak-Nolte has shown that studying the fracture processes of synthetic rock can help to predict rocks in the real world.

Academic service 
Throughout her career Pyrak-Nolte has worked with the United States Department of Energy (DOE), as part of both the councils on Earth Sciences and Chemical Sciences, Geosciences and Biosciences. From 2017 to 2019 Pyrak-Nolte served as President of the American Rock Mechanics Association (ARMA). In 2018 Pyrak-Nolte was the first woman to deliver the annual International Society for Rock Mechanics and Rock Engineering online lecture in its thirty-year history. From 2019 to 2023 she is the Vice President of North America to the International Society for Rock Mechanics (ISRM). In 2019 she was elected President of the International Society for Porous Media.

Awards and honours 

 1995 International Society of Rock Mechanics Schlumberger Lecture Award
 2013 Elected Fellow of the American Rock Mechanics Association
 2020 Society of Exploration Geophysicists Reginald Fessenden Award
 2020 Elected Fellow of the American Geophysical Union
 2020 Elected Fellow of the American Association for the Advancement of Science AAAS
 2021 Elected Member of the National Academy of Engineering
 2022 Elected Member of the American Academy of Arts and Sciences

Selected publications

References 

American geophysicists
Women geophysicists
Virginia Tech alumni
University of California, Berkeley alumni
University of Notre Dame faculty
Year of birth missing (living people)
Place of birth missing (living people)
American women scientists
Fellows of the American Geophysical Union
Members of the United States National Academy of Engineering
American Academy of Arts and Sciences
Living people
American women academics
21st-century American women